This is a list of 197 species in Eratoneura, a genus of leafhoppers in the family Cicadellidae.

Eratoneura species

 Eratoneura abjecta (Beamer, 1931) c g
 Eratoneura acantha (Ross & DeLong, 1950) c g b
 Eratoneura accita (Knull, 1954) c g
 Eratoneura accola (McAtee, 1920) c g
 Eratoneura aculeata (Beamer, 1932) c g
 Eratoneura adunca (Beamer, 1932) c g
 Eratoneura aesculi (Beamer, 1932) c g
 Eratoneura affinis (Fitch, 1851) c g b
 Eratoneura alicia (Ross, 1957) c g
 Eratoneura alloplana (Ross, 1956) c g
 Eratoneura amethica (Ross, 1957) c g
 Eratoneura andersoni (Beamer, 1932) c g
 Eratoneura anseri (Hepner, 1966) c g
 Eratoneura ardens (McAtee, 1920) c g b
 Eratoneura arenosa (Ross & DeLong, 1950) c g
 Eratoneura arpegia (Ross, 1957) c g b
 Eratoneura arta (Beamer, 1931) c g
 Eratoneura ballista (Beamer, 1932) c g
 Eratoneura basilaris (Say, 1825) c g b
 Eratoneura beeri (Hepner, 1972) c g b
 Eratoneura bella (McAtee, 1920) c g b
 Eratoneura betulae Dmitriev & Dietrich, 2010 c g
 Eratoneura bifida (Beamer, 1931) c g
 Eratoneura bigemina (McAtee, 1920) c g b
 Eratoneura biramosa (Beamer, 1941) c g
 Eratoneura bispinosa (Beamer, 1931) c g
 Eratoneura brevipes (Beamer, 1931) c g
 Eratoneura brooki (Hepner, 1969) c g
 Eratoneura calamitosa (Beamer, 1931) c g
 Eratoneura campora (Robinson, 1924) c g
 Eratoneura carmini (Beamer, 1929) c g b
 Eratoneura cera (Hepner, 1966) c g
 Eratoneura certa (Beamer, 1932) c g
 Eratoneura citrosa (Ross, 1956) c g
 Eratoneura clara (Beamer, 1932) c g
 Eratoneura claroides (Hepner, 1967) c g
 Eratoneura clavipes (Beamer, 1931) c g
 Eratoneura comoides (Ross & DeLong, 1953) c g b
 Eratoneura concisa (Beamer, 1931) c g
 Eratoneura confirmata (McAtee, 1924) c g b
 Eratoneura continua (Knull & Auten, 1937) c g
 Eratoneura contracta (Beamer, 1931) c g
 Eratoneura corylorubra (Knull, 1945) c g
 Eratoneura coxi (Ross & DeLong, 1950) c g
 Eratoneura crinita (Beamer, 1932) c g
 Eratoneura cristata (Knull, 1951) c g
 Eratoneura curta (Beamer, 1932) c g
 Eratoneura curvata (Beamer, 1931) c g
 Eratoneura delongi (Knull & Auten, 1937) c g
 Eratoneura dimidiata (Knull, 1949) c g
 Eratoneura dira (Beamer, 1931) c g
 Eratoneura direpta (Knull, 1949) c g
 Eratoneura distincta (Knull & Auten, 1937) c g
 Eratoneura dumosa (Beamer, 1932) c g
 Eratoneura econa (Ross, 1957) c g
 Eratoneura ellisi (Hepner, 1969) c g
 Eratoneura emquu (Ross & DeLong, 1953) c g
 Eratoneura era (McAtee, 1920) c g b
 Eratoneura eversi (Ross & DeLong, 1953) c g
 Eratoneura externa (Beamer, 1931) c g
 Eratoneura facota (Beamer, 1932) c g
 Eratoneura fausta (Knull, 1951) c g
 Eratoneura fergersoni (Hepner, 1969) c g
 Eratoneura firma (Beamer, 1932) c g
 Eratoneura flexibilis (Knull, 1949) c g
 Eratoneura forfex (Beamer, 1932) c g
 Eratoneura fulleri (Hepner, 1967) c g b
 Eratoneura gemina (McAtee, 1920) c g
 Eratoneura gemoides (Ross, 1953) c g
 Eratoneura geronimoi (Knull, 1945) c g
 Eratoneura gilesi (Hepner, 1966) c g
 Eratoneura gillettei (Beamer, 1931) c g
 Eratoneura glicilla (Ross, 1956) c g
 Eratoneura greeni (Hepner, 1969) c g
 Eratoneura guicei (Hepner, 1972) c g
 Eratoneura harnedi (Hepner, 1966) c g
 Eratoneura harpola (Ross, 1956) c g
 Eratoneura hartii (Gillette, 1898) c g b
 Eratoneura havana (Ross & DeLong, 1953) c g
 Eratoneura haysensis (Hepner, 1966) c g
 Eratoneura hyalina (Knull & Auten, 1937) c g
 Eratoneura hymac (Robinson, 1924) c g
 Eratoneura hymettana (Knull, 1949) c g b
 Eratoneura igella (Ross & DeLong, 1950) c g
 Eratoneura imbricariae (Ross & DeLong, 1953) c g b
 Eratoneura immota (Beamer, 1932) c g
 Eratoneura impar (Beamer, 1931) c g
 Eratoneura incondita (Beamer, 1932) c g
 Eratoneura inepta (Beamer, 1932) c g
 Eratoneura ingrata (Beamer, 1932) c g
 Eratoneura inksana (Knull, 1954) c g
 Eratoneura interna (Beamer, 1931) c g
 Eratoneura knighti (Beamer, 1932) c g
 Eratoneura knullae (Ross, 1953) c g
 Eratoneura lamucata (Ross & DeLong, 1953) c g
 Eratoneura lata (Beamer, 1932) c g
 Eratoneura lawsoni (Robinson, 1924) c g
 Eratoneura lenta (Beamer, 1932) c g b
 Eratoneura levecki (Hepner, 1966) c g
 Eratoneura ligata (McAtee, 1920) c g b
 Eratoneura linea (Beamer, 1932) c g
 Eratoneura longa (Knull, 1955) c g
 Eratoneura longifurca (Hepner, 1966) c g
 Eratoneura luculenta (Knull, 1949) c g
 Eratoneura lucyae (Hepner, 1966) c g
 Eratoneura lunata (McAtee, 1924) c g b
 Eratoneura lundi (Hepner, 1967) c g
 Eratoneura lusoria (Van Duzee, 1924) c g
 Eratoneura macra (Beamer, 1932) c g
 Eratoneura maculata (Gillette, 1898) c g
 Eratoneura maga (Knull, 1951) c g
 Eratoneura malaca (Knull, 1949) c g
 Eratoneura manus (Beamer, 1932) c g
 Eratoneura marilandicae (Ross, 1957) c g
 Eratoneura marra (Beamer, 1932) c g
 Eratoneura mcateei Dmitriev & Dietrich, 2010 c g
 Eratoneura mensa (Beamer, 1931) c g
 Eratoneura metopia (Ross, 1957) c g
 Eratoneura micheneri (Hepner, 1972) c g b
 Eratoneura millsi (Ross & DeLong, 1950) c g
 Eratoneura mimica (Ross, 1957) c g
 Eratoneura minor (Beamer, 1932) c g
 Eratoneura mira (Beamer, 1932) c g b
 Eratoneura mirifica (Beamer, 1932) c g
 Eratoneura misera (Beamer, 1932) c g
 Eratoneura morgani (DeLong, 1916) c g b
 Eratoneura nevadensis (Beamer, 1932) c g
 Eratoneura nigriventer (Beamer, 1931) c g
 Eratoneura nimia (Knull, 1954) c g
 Eratoneura noncuspidis (Beamer, 1931) c g b
 Eratoneura omani (Beamer, 1930) c g
 Eratoneura opulenta (Beamer, 1932) c g b
 Eratoneura osborni (DeLong, 1916) c g b
 Eratoneura pamelae (Hepner, 1967) c g
 Eratoneura paraesculi (Knull, 1945) c g b
 Eratoneura parallela (McAtee, 1924) c g
 Eratoneura parva (Beamer, 1932) c g b
 Eratoneura parvipes (Beamer, 1931) c g
 Eratoneura patris (Ross & DeLong, 1953) c g
 Eratoneura penerostrata (Beamer, 1932) c g
 Eratoneura penesica (Beamer, 1931) c g
 Eratoneura phellos (Ross & DeLong, 1953) c g
 Eratoneura prolixa (Knull, 1949) c g
 Eratoneura propria (Beamer, 1932) c g
 Eratoneura protuma (Ross, 1957) c g
 Eratoneura pyra (McAtee, 1924) c g
 Eratoneura rangifer (Ross & DeLong, 1950) c g
 Eratoneura restricta (Beamer, 1932) c g b
 Eratoneura retusa (Beamer, 1932) c g
 Eratoneura richardsi (Ross, 1953) c g
 Eratoneura robusta (Knull, 1955) c g
 Eratoneura rostrata (Beamer, 1931) c g
 Eratoneura rotunda (Beamer, 1931) c g
 Eratoneura rubranotata (Beamer, 1927) c g
 Eratoneura rubraza (Robinson, 1924) c g b
 Eratoneura sancta (Beamer, 1932) c g
 Eratoneura sanctaerosae (Hepner, 1967) c g
 Eratoneura sandersoni (Ross, 1956) c g
 Eratoneura sebringensis (Hepner, 1966) c g
 Eratoneura separata (Beamer, 1932) c g
 Eratoneura severini (Knull, 1949) c g
 Eratoneura smithi (Ross, 1956) c g
 Eratoneura socia (Knull, 1954) c g
 Eratoneura solita (Beamer, 1932) c g b
 Eratoneura sorota (Hepner, 1975) c g
 Eratoneura spala (Ross & DeLong, 1950) c g
 Eratoneura spinea (Knull, 1951) c g
 Eratoneura spinifera (Beamer, 1931) c g
 Eratoneura staffordi (Hepner, 1966) c g
 Eratoneura staminea (Knull, 1954) c g
 Eratoneura stannardi (Hepner, 1967) c g
 Eratoneura stephensoni (Beamer, 1931) c g b
 Eratoneura stoveri (Ross & DeLong, 1950) c g
 Eratoneura stupkaorum (Knull, 1945) c g
 Eratoneura tammina (Ross & DeLong, 1953) c g
 Eratoneura tantilla (Beamer, 1931) c g
 Eratoneura tantula (Knull, 1954) c g
 Eratoneura tenuitas (Knull, 1954) c g
 Eratoneura teres (Beamer, 1931) c g
 Eratoneura tersa (Knull, 1951) c g
 Eratoneura teshi (Hepner, 1972) c g
 Eratoneura texana (Beamer, 1929) c g
 Eratoneura torella (Robinson, 1924) c g
 Eratoneura trautmanae (Knull, 1945) c g
 Eratoneura triangulata (Beamer, 1931) c g
 Eratoneura trivittata (Robinson, 1924) c g b
 Eratoneura tumida (Knull, 1954) c g
 Eratoneura turgida (Beamer, 1931) c g
 Eratoneura unca (Knull, 1954) c g
 Eratoneura uncinata (Beamer, 1931) c g
 Eratoneura ungulata (Beamer, 1932) c g b
 Eratoneura unica (Beamer, 1932) c g
 Eratoneura usitata (Beamer, 1932) c g
 Eratoneura uvaldeana (Knull, 1949) c g
 Eratoneura valida (Knull, 1954) c g
 Eratoneura vittata (Knull & Auten, 1937) c g
 Eratoneura zioni (Beamer, 1932) c g

Data sources: i = ITIS, c = Catalogue of Life, g = GBIF, b = Bugguide.net

References

Eratoneura